Owain Harris-Allan is a Welsh boxer. He competed at the 2022 Commonwealth Games, winning the bronze medal in the men's bantamweight event. Harris-Allan took up boxing at the age of seven.

References 

Living people
Place of birth missing (living people)
Year of birth missing (living people)
Welsh male boxers
Bantamweight boxers
Boxers at the 2022 Commonwealth Games
Commonwealth Games bronze medallists for Wales
Commonwealth Games medallists in boxing
21st-century Welsh people
Medallists at the 2022 Commonwealth Games